Clethra longispicata is a tree in the family Clethraceae. The specific epithet  is from the Latin meaning "long spike", referring to the inflorescence.

Description
The fissured bark is brown. The scented flowers are white.

Distribution and habitat
Clethra longispicata grows naturally in Borneo, the Philippines and Sulawesi.

References

longispicata
Trees of Borneo
Trees of the Philippines
Trees of Sulawesi
Plants described in 1922